Dr. James Alfred Obita is a Ugandan politician.  By profession an industrial biochemist, he serves as the Secretary For External Affairs And Mobilisation, and Leader of Delegation for the Lord's Resistance Movement.

References

Ugandan politicians
Ugandan biochemists
Lord's Resistance Army rebels
Living people
Year of birth missing (living people)